Cemitério de São João Batista is a municipal necropolis originally owned and operated by the Santa Casa da Misericórdia do Rio de Janeiro (Holy House of Mercy of Rio de Janeiro), and run, since August 2014, by the private company Rio Pax.

Located in the neighborhood of Botafogo, it is the only cemetery in the city's south area, the Zona Sul, and, on October 5, 2015, it became the first cemetery in Latin America to be featured in Google Street View.

Notable burials

 Ary Barroso – Brazilian composer
 Álvares de Azevedo – Brazilian poet, playwright and essayist
 Alberto Santos-Dumont – Brazilian aviator
 Antônio Carlos Jobim – Brazilian musician (composer of "The Girl From Ipanema")
 Artur Bernardes – 12th President of Brazil
 Artur da Costa e Silva – 27th President of Brazil
 Aurora Miranda – Brazilian singer, dancer, sister of Carmen Miranda
 Bussunda – Brazilian comedian and TV personality
 Café Filho – 18th President of Brazil
 Candido Portinari – Brazilian painter
 Cândido Rondon – Brazilian explorer
 Carmélia Alves – Brazilian singer
 Carmen Miranda – Portuguese Brazilian singer and actress
 Cazuza – Brazilian composer and singer
 Cecília Meireles – Brazilian writer and educator
 Chacrinha – Brazilian TV entertainer
 Clara Nunes – Brazilian singer
 Damião Experiença – Brazilian outsider musician
 Dorival Caymmi – Brazilian musician, actor and painter
 Emílio Garrastazu Médici – 28th Brazilian President
 Ernesto Geisel – 29th President of Brazil
 Eurico Gaspar Dutra – 16th President of Brazil
 Floriano Peixoto – 2nd President of Brazil
 Francisco José do Nascimento (1839–1914) – Afro-Brazilian abolitionist
 Heitor Villa-Lobos – Brazilian composer
 Izidor "Dori" Kürschner, also often Kru(e)schner (1895–1941) – Hungarian association football coach-
 João Alfredo Correia de Oliveira – Prime Minister of the Brazilian Empire
 João Havelange – 7th President of FIFA
 Jorge José Emiliano dos Santos – Brazilian football referee
 José Linhares – 15th President of Brazil
 Júlio Ximenes Sênior – Brazilian scientist, author and Brazilian Army General
 Luís Cruls – Belgian-born Brazilian astronomer and geodesist
 Marcelo Caetano – Prime-Minister of Portugal
 Marília Pêra – Brazilian actress
 Nelson Gonçalves – Brazilian singer
 Nelson Rodrigues – Brazilian playwright, journalist and novelist
 Nilo Peçanha – 7th President of Brazil
 Oscar Cox – Founder of Fluminense Football Club
 Oscar Niemeyer –  Brazilian architect who designed civic buildings for Brasilia.
 Osvaldo Aranha – Brazilian diplomat
 Oswaldo Cruz – Brazilian physician, bacteriologist, epidemiologist and public health officer and the founder of the Oswaldo Cruz Institute
 Otto Glória – association football coach
 Roberto Marinho – Founder of the biggest Brazilian TV channel, Rede Globo
 Vinicius de Moraes – Brazilian poet, composer and diplomat

References

São João
Roman Catholic cemeteries
1852 establishments in Brazil
Necropoleis